Shoshana Simone Chatfield (born October 5, 1965) is a United States Navy rear admiral, and is currently serving as the president of the Naval War College. She is the first woman to ever hold that position.

Early life and education
Shoshana Chatfield hails from Garden Grove, California, graduating from Pacifica High School in 1983. She then received her bachelor's degree in International Relations and French from Boston University in 1987. After she received a commission in the Navy, she would attend the Kennedy School of Government at Harvard and receive a Master's degree in Public Administration. Admiral Chatfield would go on to receive a Doctorate of education from the University of San Diego.

Military career

Admiral Chatfield commissioned through Boston University's Naval Reserve Officers Training Corps program, and qualified as a naval helicopter pilot in 1989. She's flown the Boeing Vertol CH-46 Sea Knight, Sikorsky SH-3 Sea King, and the Sikorsky SH-60 Seahawk while attached to Helicopter Combat Support and Helicopter Sea Combat squadrons.

She has commanded several military units, including Joint Region Marianas and, most recently, the Naval War College.

From 2001 to 2004 she was an assistant professor of political science at the United States Air Force Academy.

In February 2023, Chatfield was nominated for promotion to vice admiral.

Honors and awards
In addition to her military honors, Admiral Chatfield has received recognition from the government of Guam for her leadership and contributions to the island. In 2009, she was named as one of Boston University's distinguished alumni.

References

External links
 

1965 births
Living people
People from Garden Grove, California
Boston University College of Arts and Sciences alumni
United States Naval Aviators
Harvard Kennedy School alumni
University of San Diego alumni
Recipients of the Meritorious Service Medal (United States)
Recipients of the Legion of Merit
Female admirals of the United States Navy
United States Navy rear admirals (upper half)
Recipients of the Defense Superior Service Medal
20th-century American naval officers
21st-century American naval officers
Presidents of the Naval War College
20th-century American women
21st-century American women
Military personnel from California
Women heads of universities and colleges